is an athletic stadium in Kumamoto, Kumamoto, Japan.

External links

Roasso Kumamoto
Buildings and structures in Kumamoto
Football venues in Japan
Sports venues in Kumamoto Prefecture
1960 establishments in Japan
Sports venues completed in 1960